The Church of Jesus Christ of Latter-day Saints in Colombia refers to the Church of Jesus Christ of Latter-day Saints (LDS Church) and its members in Colombia. The first small branch was established in 1966. Since then, the LDS Church in Colombia has grown to more than 200,000 members in 249 congregations, making it the 7th largest body of members in South America and the 11th largest worldwide.

History

In May 1966, the first missionaries arrived. Five years later, 27 congregations were established in 10 cities. From 1981 to 1984, Julio E. Dávila served as president of the Colombia Cali Mission of the church. Dávila was the first Colombian to serve as a mission president in the church.

Missions

Temples

See also

Religion in Colombia

References

External links
 The Church of Jesus Christ of Latter-day Saints Official site
 Church News "Country information: Colombia" 
 Newsroom (Colombia)